Cosmos Football Academy de Bafia is a Cameroonian football club based in Bafia. They are a member of the Cameroonian Football Federation and Elite One, the topflight football league of Cameroon.

Achievements

Stadium
Currently the team plays at the Stade de Bafia.

Performance in CAF competitions

References

External links

Football clubs in Cameroon
Sports clubs in Cameroon